Posyolok Pokrovskogo torfouchastka is a rural locality (a settlement) in Nagornoye Rural Settlement, Petushinsky District, Vladimir Oblast, Russia. The population was 244 as of 2010.

Geography 
The settlement is located 24 km southwest of Petushki (the district's administrative centre) by road. Pokrovskogo lesouchastka is the nearest rural locality.

References 

Rural localities in Petushinsky District